Ecurie may refer to:

 Écurie, a commune in the Pas-de-Calais département in France
 Several car racing teams (compare scuderias) :
 Ecurie Belge 
 Ecurie Bleue 
 Ecurie Bonnier 
 Ecurie Ecosse, a former motor racing team from Scotland
 Ecurie Espadon
 Ecurie Francorchamps
 Ecurie Lutetia 
 Ecurie Maarsbergen
 Ecurie Nationale Belge
 Ecurie Rosier

ECURIE may refer to :
 European Community Urgent Radiological Information Exchange, the European early notification system in the event of a radiological or nuclear emergency.

See also

 Ecury (disambiguation)
 
 Scuderia (disambiguation)